Kathleen Karr (née Csere; April 21, 1946 – December 6, 2017) was an American author of historical novels for children and young adults. She is the winner of the Golden Kite Award for her book, The Boxer.

Early life and education
Karr was born April 21, 1946, in Allentown, Pennsylvania and grew up on a chicken farm in the Dorothy section of Weymouth Township, New Jersey She graduated from Catholic University of America in Washington, D.C. in 1968 and received a master's degree in English literature from Providence College in Providence, Rhode Island in 1971.

Career

Karr worked at the newly formed American Film Institute in Washington, D.C. in 1971. After a year there, she worked for the Circle Theatre chain until her daughter was born. She wrote her first novel, Light of My Heart, in 1984. After her young children asked her to write a story for them, she published her first children's book, It Ain't Always Easy (1990), and began a full-time career writing for children and young adults.

In her novel The Great Turkey Walk, she depicts the movement of poultry from county to county where poultry was walked from Union, West Virginia in Monroe County to the stockpens in much the same way it was done for centuries.

She is the author of Gilbert and Sullivan Set Me Free about a women's prison. Based on a historical event in 1914, the inmates of Sherborn Women's Prison in Sherborn, Massachusetts put on a performance of The Pirates of Penzance.  In her novel, the prison's chaplain uses the transformative power of music and theater in helping reform inmates and in bringing them together in spirited community.

Death
Karr died December 6, 2017, in Chicago, Illinois.

Titles
Fortune's Fool (2008)
Born for Adventure (2007)
Worlds Apart (2005)
Mama Went to Jail for the Vote (2005)
Exiled: Memoirs of a Camel (2004)
Gilbert & Sullivan Set Me Free (2003)
The 7th Knot (2003)
Bone Dry (2002)
Playing With Fire (2001)
The Boxer (2000)
It Happened In the White House (2000)
Skullduggery (2000)
Man of the Family (1999)
The Great Turkey Walk (1998)
Oregon, Sweet Oregon (1998)
Lighthouse Mermaid (1998)
Gold Rush Phoebe (1998)
Phoebe's Folly (1997)
Spy in the Sky (1997)
Go West, Young Women (1997)
In The Kaiser's Clutch (1995)
Oh, Those Harper Girls (1995)
The Cave (1994)
The Promised Land (1993)
Gideon and the Mummy Professor (1993)
It Ain't Always Easy (1990)

References

External links
 
"Obituary: Kathleen Karr", Publishers Weekly, December 12, 2017
"Kathleen Karr, children's writer who entwined history and humor, dies at 71", The Washington Post, January 10, 2018

1946 births
2017 deaths
American children's writers
American historical novelists
Agatha Award winners
Catholic University of America alumni
Writers from Allentown, Pennsylvania
People from Weymouth Township, New Jersey
Providence College alumni
Writers from Washington, D.C.
American women novelists
Women historical novelists
Women mystery writers
Novelists from Pennsylvania
Novelists from New Jersey
21st-century American women